3-Methyl-1-pentanol (IUPAC name: 3-methylpentan-1-ol) is an organic chemical compound. It occurs naturally in Capsicum frutescens, the tabasco pepper.

References 

Flavors
Hexanols